Wigger is a term for a white person who imitates African American culture. 

Wigger may also refer to:
 A maker of wigs
 Wigger (surname)
 Wigger (novel), a 1974 William Goldman novel
 Wigger I, a tenth-century count of Bilstein, in modern Hesse, Germany
 Wigger (river), also called the Wiggeren, a river in Switzerland
 "Wigger", a 2013 song by Anouk

See also
 Wiggers, a Germanic patronymic surname
 Wigmore Hall, a recital venue, at 36 Wigmore Street, London; it is sometimes referred to as "Wiggers"
 Uyghur (disambiguation), for the Turkic ethnic groups of Xinjiang, China and their languages
 Mask and Wig, a performing arts club at the University of Pennsylvania, members of which are known as "Mask and Wiggers"